Midway is an unincorporated community in Morgan County, Tennessee, United States.

References

Unincorporated communities in Morgan County, Tennessee
Unincorporated communities in Tennessee